Dylan van Baarle (born 21 May 1992) is a Dutch professional road racing cyclist, who currently rides for UCI WorldTeam .

Biography

Born in Voorburg, van Baarle resides in Veenendaal, Netherlands.

Van Baarle is the son of former road- and trackcyclist, Mario van Baarle, and Renate Greupink-de Haas.

In 2014, van Baarle won the Tour of Britain; he gained the yellow jersey on the seventh stage, and successfully defended the jersey on the eighth and final stage. He was named in the start list for the 2015 Tour de France.

Between 2015-2020 Van Baarle had some high places, consistently in the Tour of Flanders, but no major wins aside from the ITT in the 2018 National Championships. In early 2021 he won Dwars door Vlaanderen and late in the year took 2nd in the UCI World Championships. A week later he entered 2021 Paris-Roubaix, which was rescheduled due to the Covid pandemic, and finished outside the time limit. Also in 2021 he started and finished the Tour de France for the 6th time. 

In 2022 he had his best ever finish in a Cycling monument when he finished 2nd in the race where he had always had good results, the Tour of Flanders. A few weeks later he won his first Monument when he launched a successful solo attack in Paris-Roubaix, finishing nearly two minutes ahead of 2nd place Wout Van Aert. 

Major results

Road

2009
 2nd Time trial, National Junior Championships
 2nd Overall Trofeo Karlsberg
1st Stage 3 (ITT)
2010
 3rd Overall Driedaagse van Axel
2011
 1st Stage 2b (TTT) Vuelta Ciclista a León
 10th Omloop der Kempen
2012
 1st  Overall Olympia's Tour
1st  Points classification
1st  Young rider classification
1st Prologue
 1st Arno Wallaard Memorial
 1st Stage 1 (TTT) Thüringen Rundfahrt der U23
 4th Time trial, National Under-23 Championships
 4th Zellik–Galmaarden
 4th Dwars door het Hageland
 7th Overall Kreiz Breizh Elites
 7th Ronde van Midden-Nederland
 9th Overall Le Triptyque des Monts et Châteaux
1st Stage 2a (ITT)
 9th Overall Tour du Poitou-Charentes
 10th Overall Tour de Normandie
2013
 National Under-23 Championships
1st  Road race
1st  Time trial
 1st  Overall Olympia's Tour
1st  Young rider classification
1st Stage 4
 1st  Overall Thüringen Rundfahrt der U23
 1st Ster van Zwolle
 1st Dorpenomloop Rucphen
 3rd Overall Tour de Normandie
 3rd Internationale Wielertrofee Jong Maar Moedig
 4th Overall Tour de Bretagne
1st  Mountains classification
1st  Sprints classification
1st  Combination classification
1st Stage 6 (ITT)
 5th Münsterland Giro
 7th Road race, UCI World Under-23 Championships
 8th Overall Le Triptyque des Monts et Châteaux
 9th Omloop Het Nieuwsblad U23
 10th Paris–Tours Espoirs
2014
 1st  Overall Tour of Britain
 5th Time trial, National Championships
 6th Overall Ster ZLM Toer
 10th Overall Dubai Tour
2015
 3rd Dwars door Vlaanderen
 5th Overall Bayern–Rundfahrt
1st  Young rider classification
 8th Overall Tour of Britain
2016
 5th Overall Tour of Britain
 5th Trofeo Pollenca–Port de Andratx
 6th Tour of Flanders
2017
 4th Tour of Flanders
 8th Dwars door Vlaanderen
 9th E3 Harelbeke
  Combativity award Stage 7 Tour de France
2018
 1st  Time trial, National Championships
 1st Stage 3 (TTT) Critérium du Dauphiné
 5th Overall BinckBank Tour
 10th Time trial, UEC European Championships
2019
 1st  Overall Herald Sun Tour
 1st Stage 8 Critérium du Dauphiné
 3rd Time trial, National Championships
 6th Overall Settimana Internazionale di Coppi e Bartali
2020
 5th Overall Tour Down Under
 5th Cadel Evans Great Ocean Road Race
 8th Tour of Flanders
2021
 1st Dwars door Vlaanderen
 2nd  Road race, UCI World Championships 
 7th E3 Saxo Bank Classic
 8th Gent–Wevelgem
 10th Tour of Flanders
2022
 1st Paris–Roubaix
 2nd Tour of Flanders
 8th E3 Saxo Bank Classic
 10th Overall Volta ao Algarve
2023
 1st Omloop Het Nieuwsblad

Grand Tour general classification results timeline

Classics results timeline

Major championship results timeline

Track

2010
 3rd Madison (with Nick Stöpler), National Championships
2012
 2nd Madison (with Michael Vingerling), National Championships
2017
 3rd Six Days of Rotterdam (with Wim Stroetinga)

References

External links

Cycling Base: Dylan van Baarle

Cycling Quotient: Dylan van Baarle
Garmin-Sharp: Dylan van Baarle

1992 births
Living people
Dutch male cyclists
Sportspeople from Voorburg
UCI Road World Championships cyclists for the Netherlands
Olympic cyclists of the Netherlands
Cyclists at the 2020 Summer Olympics
Cyclists from South Holland
20th-century Dutch people
21st-century Dutch people